Salwey Winnington (28 August 1666 – 6 November 1736), of Stanford Court, Worcestershire, was an English landowner and Member of Parliament (MP).

Winnington was the eldest son of Sir Francis Winnington, a lawyer and politician who was Solicitor General in the 1670s. He himself also entered the Middle Temple to study law.

He entered Parliament in 1694 as MP for Bewdley, one of the small number of English constituencies which was represented only by a single MP, and was its member for all but two-and-a-half years of the next twenty.

In 1690, Winnington married Anne Foley, daughter of Thomas Foley of Witley Court and sister of Lord Foley. They had one son, Thomas Winnington, who became a Member of Parliament and Privy Counsellor, and five daughters.

References

 Winnington genealogy

1666 births
1736 deaths
Politicians from Worcestershire
Members of the Middle Temple
English landowners
English MPs 1690–1695
English MPs 1695–1698
English MPs 1698–1700
English MPs 1701
English MPs 1701–1702
English MPs 1702–1705
English MPs 1705–1707
Members of the Parliament of Great Britain for English constituencies
Tory MPs (pre-1834)
British MPs 1707–1708
British MPs 1710–1713
British MPs 1713–1715